Morteza Yazdanpanah (1888–1970) was an army officer who served as chief-of-staff in the Imperial Iranian army for two times, between 1941 and 1942 and in 1952. He also held other governmental and military positions during the reigns of Reza Shah and Mohammad Reza Pahlavi.

Early life and education
Yazdanpanah was born in Tehran in 1888. His father was a colonel in the army. From 1907 Morteza Yazdanpanah attended Cossack's House which trained army officers for Cossack Brigade.

Career
Yazdanpanah was one of the close allies of Reza Shah, but later their relations became tense. Yazdanpanah was the commander of the Iranian army's northern division during the coup organized by Reza Shah against Qajar dynasty in 1921. The same year he was promoted to brigadier general. During that period there were only six military officers who held this title in the army. He was also the governor general of Tehran and the commander of the first army.

In 1926 Yazdanpanah was next to Reza Shah during the latter's coronation ceremony. Yazdanpanah was one of the founders of Iran-e-No Party, a short-lived anticlerical political party, in 1927. In 1928 he was made major general and chief inspector of the army, and next year he was appointed chief commander of the gendarme. 

Yazdanpanah was also assigned to significant posts by the next Shah, Mohammad Reza Pahlavi. He was promoted to the rank of lieutenant general in 1942. On 4 April 1950 Yazdanpanah was named as the minister of war in the cabinet of Prime Minister Ali Mansur and remained in the office until June 1950 when a new cabinet was formed by Haj Ali Razmara. Yazdanpanah's successor as war minister was Abdollah Hedayat.

Yazdanpanah also served as the minister of war between December 1951 and June 1952 in the cabinet led by Prime Minister Mohammad Mosaddegh. Mosaddegh asked him to retire, but Yazdanpanah did not accept his request. Therefore, Yazdanpanah was dismissed from office and replaced by Mahmoud Baharmast in the post.

From June 1963 Yazdanpanah was one of the senior military advisors to Mohammad Reza Pahlavi being the head of the Imperial Inspectorate and was also made a senator in 1967. He was the head of the High Council for the Coronation (Persian: Shura-yi ʿAli-yi Tajguzari) which organized the coronation ceremony of Mohammad Reza Pahlavi in 1967. He was one of ten people who had direct access to the Shah Mohammad Reza.

Personal life and death
Yazdanpanah's wife, Leyla, was born in Russia, and her father was the governor of Russian Azarbaijan. Yazdanpanah died in 1970.

References

External links

20th-century Iranian politicians
1888 births
1970 deaths
Defence ministers of Iran
Imperial Iranian Army lieutenant generals
People of Pahlavi Iran
Politicians from Tehran
Members of the Senate of Iran
Governors of Tehran Province